US Post Office-Herkimer is a historic post office building located at Herkimer in Herkimer County, New York, United States. It was designed and built in 1933-1934 by consulting architect Ross Edgar Sluyter for the Office of the Supervising Architect of the Treasury Department.  It is a one-story, seven bay building faced with red brick laid in Flemish bond above a granite clad foundation in the Colonial Revival style.  The five central bays are formed as a central pavilion and faced in terra cotta marked by Corinthian order pilasters.

It was listed on the National Register of Historic Places in 1989.

References

Herkimer
Government buildings completed in 1934
Colonial Revival architecture in New York (state)
Buildings and structures in Herkimer County, New York
National Register of Historic Places in Herkimer County, New York
1934 establishments in New York (state)